Ronnie Jones (June 2, 1949 – June 16, 1996) was an American country music singer known professionally as Anthony Armstrong Jones, a stage name that he took from the name of the British photographer who married Princess Margaret, Countess of Snowdon. A former professional golfer, Jones recorded four albums for Chart Records in that timespan, in addition to charting six times in the Top 40 on the Billboard country singles charts. His debut single was a No. 22-peaking cover of "Proud Mary," originally by Creedence Clearwater Revival, which served as the title track of his first album.  Its second single was "New Orleans," originally recorded by Gary U. S. Bonds.

Jones' second album, Take a Letter Maria, produced his biggest hit in its No. 8 title track, a cover of the pop hit for R. B. Greaves. Later that year, he released Sugar in the Flowers, which produced singles in "Lead Me Not into Temptation" and its title track. Finishing off his single releases that year was a rendition of Neil Diamond's "Sweet Caroline," which Jones recorded on Take a Letter Maria.

Jones later moved to Epic Records, where he charted three singles in 1973, including a No. 33 cover of Jim Croce's "Bad, Bad Leroy Brown". He recorded for Homa Records in the 1970s but did not have any chart success, and charted for the last time in 1986 with the No. 74 "Those Eyes" on the Air label. After retiring from the music business, Jones founded a club called Proud Mary in Shreveport, Louisiana. He died on June 16, 1996.

Discography

Albums

Singles

AB-side to "Lead Me Not into Temptation."

References

Anthony Armstrong Jones biography at Chart Records.net

1949 births
1996 deaths
People from Ada, Oklahoma
American country singer-songwriters
American male singer-songwriters
Country musicians from Oklahoma
20th-century American singers
Singer-songwriters from Oklahoma
20th-century American male singers